Rebecca "Becky" Downie (born 24 January 1992 in Nottingham) is a British artistic gymnast who competed at the 2008 and 2016 Summer Olympics. She is a double European champion (2014 and 2016) and 2014 Commonwealth Games champion on the uneven bars as well as the 2019 World silver medallist.

Her younger sister, Ellie Downie, was also an Olympic gymnast.

Junior career 
Representing England at the 2006 Commonwealth Games in Melbourne, Downie contributed an all-around score of 54.100 to the English team's second-place finish and placed eighth in the all-around final with a score of 53.700. In event finals, she placed fifth on uneven bars, scoring 14.000, and third on balance beam, scoring 14.075.

Senior career

2008 
At the 2008 European Women's Artistic Gymnastics Championships in Clermont-Ferrand in early April, Downie contributed scores of 14.750 on vault, 15.375 on uneven bars, and 14.850 on balance beam to the British team's sixth-place finish. In event finals, she placed eighth on vault (13.500) and uneven bars (14.700). Later in April, she won a silver medal on bars at the Artistic Gymnastics World Cup event in Cottbus, with a score of 14.975.

In June, Downie competed at the British Championships in Guildford, where she won the all-around competition (59.650) and the uneven bars title (15.200) and placed fourth on balance beam (14.500). Afterwards, she was named to the British team for the 2008 Summer Olympics in Beijing.

At the Olympics in August, Downie contributed an all-around score of 58.075 to the British team's ninth-place finish. In the individual all-around final, she scored 59.450 to place twelfth.

2009 
In March, Downie placed fourth at the American Cup in Chicago with a score of 55.600. The following month, she competed at the 2009 European Championships in Milan, where she placed eleventh in the all-around final (55.075) and sixth on vault (14.025) and uneven bars (14.525).

At the World Cup event in Glasgow in May, she placed sixth on vault (12.925), second on uneven bars (14.600), and fifth on balance beam (13.300).

In March, she won the all-around at the British Championships in Liverpool with a score of 56.100. In event finals, she placed second on vault, scoring 13.250; first on uneven bars, scoring 13.850; first on balance beam, scoring 14.900; and first on floor, scoring 13.750.

In October, Downie competed at the 2009 World Artistic Gymnastics Championships in London. She placed sixteenth in the all-around final with a score of 53.775.

2010 
In April, Downie placed tenth on uneven bars (13.300) and ninth on balance beam (13.875) at the World Cup event in Paris. In May, at the 2010 European Championships in Birmingham, she contributed scores of 14.075 on vault, 14.350 on uneven bars, and 14.100 on balance beam to the British team's second-place finish, and placed fifth in the bars final with a score of 14.625.

At the 2010 World Championships in Rotterdam in October, she contributed a vault score of 14.733 to the British team's seventh-place finish.

2011 
Downie injured her Achilles tendon in January 2011 and was expected to be out of competition for the rest of the year. However, she was able to return in nine months. "I guess the key for my quick return was that I was backed 100 percent by a fantastic medical team, and rather than let myself get down about the injury, I just had to keep reminding myself of all the positives that could come from it," she said. "I took the opportunity to give my body a break which wouldn't have been possible without the injury, and then everything just moved so quickly."

In October, she competed at the 2011 World Championships in Tokyo and contributed an uneven bars score of 14.433 to the British team's fifth-place finish.

2012 
At the beginning of June, Downie competed at an international friendly in Ipswich with gymnasts from Finland and Spain, which also served as Britain's second Olympic trial. She placed fourth on vault with a score of 14.100 and fourth on balance beam with a score of 13.450.

The British Championships in Liverpool at the end of June were the third and final trial to determine the British team for the 2012 Summer Olympics in London. Downie did not compete on floor but scored 14.550 on vault, 14.25 on uneven bars, and 13.100 on balance beam. In event finals, she placed sixth on uneven bars with a score of 13.350 and second on balance beam with a score of 13.850. She did not make the Olympic team, but was named as an alternate.

2013 

At the 2013 European Championships, Downie qualified second into the uneven bars final with a score of 14.733, behind only reigning Olympic uneven bars champion Aliya Mustafina. However, a fall in the final left her in seventh place with a score of 13.000.

2014 

Downie was a member of the British team that won a silver medal at the 2014 European Championships, after qualifying to the team final in first place. Individually, she won the uneven bars title—the second British woman to do so after Beth Tweddle—and finished fourth in the balance beam final.

In July, she won gold with the English team at the 2014 Commonwealth Games in Glasgow, alongside teammates Claudia Fragapane, Ruby Harrold, Kelly Simm, and Hannah Whelan. She also won the uneven bars final with a score of 14.666; Harrold placed third. However, she fell twice in the balance beam final and was unable to finish her routine, resulting in a score of 9.833.

At the 2014 World Championships in Nanning, Downie performed well on bars and beam to help Britain qualify to the team final in fourth place: the highest ever qualification placement for a British women's team at a World Championships. She also qualified to the bars final in sixth place with a score of 15.166, and finished fifth in the final with the same score.

2015 
At the 2015 European Championships, Downie won silver medals on the uneven bars and balance beam. Later in the year, she helped Britain win its first-ever team World Championship medal in women's gymnastics, a bronze at the 2015 Championships in Glasgow.

2016 
Downie was named to the British team for the 2016 Summer Olympics in Rio de Janeiro—her second Olympics—alongside her younger sister Ellie Downie, Claudia Fragapane, Ruby Harrold, and Amy Tinkler. She entered the competition as a contender on uneven bars, but placed 10th in a packed field in qualifications and did not qualify to the final. However, the British team finished fifth, Britain's best Olympic result in women's gymnastics since 1928.

2017 
Downie competed on uneven bars and balance beam at the 2017 European Championships in Cluj-Napoca. She qualified to the bars final in fourth place with a score of 14.433, but in the final, she placed seventh with a score of 13.000 after falling on a release move and injuring her elbow. She withdrew from the beam final the next day because of the injury.

2018 
On 6 July Downie was named to the team to compete at the 2018 European Championships alongside Alice Kinsella, Georgia-Mae Fenton, Kelly Simm, and Lucy Stanhope. On 7–8 July Downie returned to competition and competed at the Heerenveen Friendly where she tied for first on uneven bars and Great Britain placed third in the team final. Downie withdrew from the European Championships after sustaining an ankle injury during podium training.

On September 27, Downie was named to the team to compete at the World Championships in Doha, Qatar alongside Alice Kinsella, Ellie Downie, Georgia-Mae Fenton, and Kelly Simm.

2019 
In May Downie was named to the team to compete at the 2019 European Games alongside Georgia-Mae Fenton.  She won silver on uneven bars behind Angelina Melnikova of Russia.

In September Downie was named to the team to compete at the 2019 World Championships in Stuttgart alongside Alice Kinsella, Ellie Downie, Taeja James, and Georgia-Mae Fenton.  During qualifications Downie helped Great Britain place seventh, earning a spot in the team final and qualifying a team for Great Britain to the 2020 Olympic Games in Tokyo.  Individually Downie qualified for the uneven bars final.  During the team final she contributed scores on uneven bars and balance beam towards Great Britain's sixth-place finish.  In the uneven bars final Downie performed a clean routine, earning a score of 15.000 and winning the silver medal behind reigning World uneven bars Champion Nina Derwael of Belgium.  This was Downie's first individual World Championships medal.  Earlier that day Downie's sister Ellie won her first individual World Championships medal, a bronze medal on vault.

2021
In March Downie competed on uneven bars and balance beam in three trials for the British Olympic team. At the first trial she placed first on balance beam; at the second trial she placed third on uneven bars; and at the third trial she placed first on uneven bars and third on balance beam.

On 6 May, the night before the final Olympic trial was set to begin, Downie's brother Joshua died suddenly at a cricket match at the age of 24. Downie subsequently did not compete in that weekend's trial, and on 13 May British Gymnastics announced that they would delay the selection process in order to give her a fair chance of making the team. However, Downie was later controversially omitted from the British Olympic team. Downie, who alongside her sister Ellie was among the athletes who spoke out against the culture of abuse in British Gymnastics in 2020, stated "I have been told by a person of significant importance - in the national team environment - that a lot of coaches do not agree with what we've [Downie and her sister] done. Maybe I did open my mouth a year too soon, I'm not sure. If this is the sacrifice [an Olympics] then this is the sacrifice, change needs to happen. I’m proud of what I did and I don’t regret it."

In September, Downie was selected to compete at the 2021 World Championships but did not qualify to any finals.

2022 
At the 2022 English Championships Downie placed second on uneven bars, seventh on balance beam, and fifth on floor exercise.  At the British Championships Downie competed the all-around for the first time in eight years; she placed sixth.  She withdrew from the uneven bars final citing illness. 

In April 2022, she and sister Ellie received honorary degrees in sport from Nottingham Trent University.

2023 

Downie was originally slated to complete at the Scottish championships but withdrew on 16 February. On 25 February she competed at the English championships and was placed 10th on bars   on 11th march downie competed at the welsh championships where she placed 1st on bars with 14.550 and 4th on bars with 12.850. https://www.gymdata.co.uk/events/scores.aspx?type=apparatus&eid=2312&coid=5

Eponymous skill
Downie has one eponymous skill listed in the Code of Points.

Competitive history

References

External links 
 
 
 Rebecca Downie at British Gymnastics

1992 births
Living people
British female artistic gymnasts
English female artistic gymnasts
Olympic gymnasts of Great Britain
Gymnasts at the 2006 Commonwealth Games
Gymnasts at the 2008 Summer Olympics
Gymnasts at the 2016 Summer Olympics
Commonwealth Games medallists in gymnastics
Commonwealth Games gold medallists for England
Commonwealth Games silver medallists for England
Commonwealth Games bronze medallists for England
Gymnasts at the 2014 Commonwealth Games
European Games medalists in gymnastics
European Games silver medalists for Great Britain
Gymnasts at the 2019 European Games
Medalists at the World Artistic Gymnastics Championships
Black British sportswomen
Sportspeople from Nottingham
Originators of elements in artistic gymnastics
European champions in gymnastics
People associated with Nottingham Trent University
Medallists at the 2006 Commonwealth Games
Medallists at the 2014 Commonwealth Games